Showtime Live Wenxin is a shopping mall in Nantun District, Taichung, Taiwan that opened on August 8, 2018. The total annual revenue in 2019 is approximately NT$2 billion.

History
 On June 23, 2014, construction of the mall officially started.
 Trial operation took place on June 22, 2018, and the mall officially opened on August 8.

See also
 List of tourist attractions in Taiwan
 Showtime Live Chiayi
 Showtime Live Taichung Station
 Showtime Live Shulin
 Showtime Live Taitung

References

External links

2018 establishments in Taiwan
Shopping malls in Taichung
Shopping malls established in 2018